William Brown ( – unknown) was a Scottish professional golfer who played in the late 19th century. Brown had one top-10 finish in The Open Championship. His best performance was a tie for fifth place in the 1877 Open Championship.

Early life
Brown was born in Scotland, circa 1854.

Golf career

The 1877 Open Championship was the 17th Open Championship, held 6 April at Musselburgh Links, Musselburgh, East Lothian, Scotland. Jamie Anderson won the Championship, by two strokes from runner-up Bob Pringle. Brown carded rounds of 39-41-45-41=166 and finished in a tie for fifth place in the tournament and took home £1 in prize money.

Later (1885), he was secretary of the St. Andrews Golf Club.

Death
Brown's date and place of death are unknown.

References

Scottish male golfers
1854 births
Year of death missing